Pidhiria is a name of several populated places in Ukraine:

 Pidhiria, Brody Raion, a village in Lviv Oblast
 , a village in Ivano-Frankivsk Oblast